Upputuru, also known as Upputur, is a small village located in Nellore mandal, Nellore district, Andhra Pradesh, India.

References

Villages in Nellore district